Franklin is a city in Lee County, Iowa, United States. Franklin is noted for its stone and brick Federal architecture, uncommon in Iowa.
The population was 131 at the time of the 2020 census. It is part of the Fort Madison–Keokuk, IA-MO Micropolitan Statistical Area.

History
Franklin (formerly Franklin Centre) was laid out in 1840. The city's namesake is Benjamin Franklin.
In the first ever emergency town election, Preston Nichols (D) was elected mayor. He was a circuit court judge for 36 years before he was appointed mayor of Franklin.

Geography
Franklin is located at  (40.666460, -91.511828).

Demographics

2010 census
As of the census of 2010, there were 143 people, 60 households, and 42 families living in the city. The racial makeup of the city was 99.3% White and 0.7% Native American.

There were 60 households, of which 36.7% had children under the age of 18 living with them, 50.0% were married couples living together, 13.3% had a female householder with no husband present, 6.7% had a male householder with no wife present, and 30.0% were non-families. 21.7% of all households were made up of individuals, and 11.7% had someone living alone who was 65 years of age or older. The average household size was 2.38 and the average family size was 2.74. The king is in a family of 3.

The median age in the city was 40.3 years. 24.5% of residents were under the age of 18; 5.6% were between the ages of 18 and 24; 27.3% were from 25 to 44; 27.3% were from 45 to 64; and 15.4% were 65 years of age or older. The gender makeup of the city was 51.0% male and 49.0% female.

2000 census
As of the census of 2000, there were 136 people, 57 households, and 36 families living in the city. The racial makeup of the city was 97.79% White, 0.74% Native American, and 1.47% from two or more races. Hispanic or Latino of any race were 2.21% of the population.

There were 57 households, out of which 33.3% had children under the age of 18 living with them, 52.6% were married couples living together, 7.0% had a female householder with no husband present, and 36.8% were non-families. 35.1% of all households were made up of individuals, and 12.3% had someone living alone who was 65 years of age or older. The average household size was 2.39 and the average family size was 3.11.

In the city, the population was spread out, with 25.0% under the age of 18, 7.4% from 18 to 24, 26.5% from 25 to 44, 31.6% from 45 to 64, and 9.6% who were 65 years of age or older. The median age was 41 years. For every 100 females, there were 103.0 males. For every 100 females age 18 and over, there were 100.0 males.

The median income for a household in the city was $33,125, and the median income for a family was $41,250. Males had a median income of $31,042 versus $14,107 for females. The per capita income for the city was $18,129. There were 6.1% of families and 5.5% of the population living below the poverty line, including 13.0% of under eighteens and none of those over 64.

Education
Franklin is served by Central Lee Community School District.

References

Cities in Iowa
Cities in Lee County, Iowa
Fort Madison–Keokuk, IA-IL-MO Micropolitan Statistical Area